The Magenta SportCup Tournament or simply called as the Magenta SportCup was a basketball competition played every preseason between teams from the EuroLeague. The format of the competition is played in a tournament style.

KK Crvena zvezda is the incumbent winner of the said tournament.

History
The Magenta SportCup Tournament was an annual competition played every September. The first edition of the tournmanet was inaugurated in 2021 in Munich, Germany.

Performance by club

References

Basketball in Germany
Basketball in Serbia